Quimper faience is produced in a factory near Quimper, in Brittany, France. Since 1708, Quimper faience ("faïence" in French) has been painted by hand, and production continues to this day. 
The "Faïenceries de Quimper" were established in "Locmaria", the historical faience quarter of the city of Quimper, near the center. The Faïencerie d'Art Breton, newly created in 1994, was also established in Quimper, but outside the historical quarter "Locmaria".
"Locmaria" now also houses a Quimper faience museum.

The pottery's design reflects a strong traditional Breton influence. One famous design which became typical for Quimper faience is the "petit breton", a naive representation of Breton man and/or woman in traditional Breton costume. The "petit breton" became popular around 1870 and is still today the main design bought by tourists.

Older Quimper faience items are strongly sought after by collectors worldwide.

Breton art
Ceramics manufacturers of France
1708 establishments in France
Quimper
Companies based in Brittany
Faience of France
French companies established in 1708
Manufacturing companies established in 1708